The men's 1500 metres competition at the 2022 European Speed Skating Championships was held on 9 January 2022.

Results
The race was started at 14:32.

References

Men's 1500 metres